London Fog may refer to:
The so-called pea soup fog in London in the late 19th century and 20th century
London fog (beverage), an Earl Grey tea-based drink
London Fog (company), a manufacturer of coats and other clothes
London Fog (nightclub), a 1960s nightclub on the Sunset Strip where The Doors first played as a house band
London Fog 1966, a live album by The Doors, recorded at the nightclub and released in 2016